Mahul Creek is a tidal creek in north west Mumbai. It opens into the Thane Creek. The creek is located near the neighbourhoods of Chembur and Mahul. It is surrounded by mangrove forests. It also serves as a discharge for excess rainwater in eastern suburban Mumbai.

References
Firm gets stay against eco-ministry's order

Estuaries of Mumbai